Water Valley may refer to a place in North America:

Canada
 Water Valley, Alberta

United States
 Water Valley, Kentucky
 Water Valley, Mississippi
 Water Valley, Texas